Hicham Belkaroui (born 24 August 1990) is an Algerian professional footballer who plays for Saudi club Al-Ain and the Algeria national team. He plays primarily as a centre-back.

Club career
In July 2014, he signed a three-year contract with Tunisian side Club Africain.

In 2019, Belkaroui signed a contract with USM Alger.

In 2020, Belkaroui signed a two-year contract with MC Oran.

In 2021, Belkaroui signed a two-year contract with ES Sétif.

On 5 September 2022, Belkaroui joined Al-Ain.

References

External links
 
 

1990 births
Algeria A' international footballers
Algeria under-23 international footballers
Algeria international footballers
Algerian expatriate footballers
Algerian expatriate sportspeople in Portugal
Algerian expatriate sportspeople in Tunisia
Algerian expatriate sportspeople in Saudi Arabia
Algerian footballers
Algerian Ligue Professionnelle 1 players
Primeira Liga players
Saudi Professional League players
Saudi First Division League players
ASM Oran players
C.D. Nacional players
Moreirense F.C. players
Club Africain players
Footballers from Oran
USM El Harrach players
WA Tlemcen players
Al-Raed FC players
Al-Ain FC (Saudi Arabia) players
Living people
Expatriate footballers in Portugal
Expatriate footballers in Tunisia
Expatriate footballers in Saudi Arabia
2017 Africa Cup of Nations players
Association football central defenders
Espérance Sportive de Tunis players
MC Oran players
21st-century Algerian people